Coleophora oligostropha is a moth of the family Coleophoridae. It is found in Mongolia.

References

oligostropha
Moths described in 1974
Moths of Asia